The Ramsey Lewis Trio at the Bohemian Caverns is a live album by the Ramsey Lewis Trio which was recorded in 1964 at the Bohemian Caverns nightclub in Washington D.C. and released on the Argo label.

Reception

Allmusic awarded the album 3 stars stating "Live at the Bohemia Caverns (in Washington D.C.) was Lewis' second live date, and one that provided a blueprint for the later live dates that would put him near the top of the pop charts a year later with The In Crowd. The material on this set was very ambitious... This is a hip date".

Track listing
All compositions by Ramsey Lewis except as indicated
 "West Side Story Medley: Somewhere/Maria/Jet Song/Somewhere" (Leonard Bernstein, Stephen Sondheim) - 11:58    
 "People" (Jule Styne, Bob Merrill) - 5:15   
 "Something You Got" (Chris Kenner) - 3:30   
 "Fly Me To The Moon (In Other Words)" (Bart Howard) - 6:00   
 "My Babe" (Willie Dixon) - 3:47   
 "The Caves" - 3:10   
 "The Shelter of Your Arms" (Shirley Collie) - 3:40

Personnel 
Ramsey Lewis - piano
Eldee Young - bass, cello
Issac "Red" Holt - drums

References 

1964 live albums
Ramsey Lewis live albums
Argo Records live albums
Albums produced by Esmond Edwards